The Pentax ZX-50, also known as the Pentax MZ-50, is a 35mm film SLR camera.

ZX-50
135 film cameras
Pentax K-mount cameras